Bascome is a surname. Notable people with the surname include:

David Bascome (born 1970), Bermudian footballer
Nelson Bascome (1955–2009), Bermudian politician
Oronde Bascome, Bermuda cricketer
Osagi Bascome (1998–2021), Bermudian footballer

Commercial use
FC Bascome Bermuda, a Bermuda football (soccer) club

See also
Bascom (disambiguation)
Bascomb
Bascombe
Baskcomb